The Valdostan regional election of 1983 took place on 26 June 1983.

The Valdostan Unions and the Christian Democracy made a centrist agreement, but judiciary problems affected the administration.

Results

Sources: Regional Council of Aosta Valley and Istituto Cattaneo

Elections in Aosta Valley
1983 elections in Italy
June 1983 events in Europe